Frauenstein Castle may refer to:

 Frauenstein Castle (Ore Mountains)
 Frauenstein Castle (Wiesbaden)